Gair may refer to:

People

Politicians
 George Gair (1926–2015), New Zealand politician
 Thomas Ashton, 1st Baron Ashton of Hyde (1855–1933), British politician
 Vince Gair (1901–1980), Australian politician
 Gair Affair, episode in Australian political life in 1974 involving Vince Gair
 Gair Ministry, ministry of the Government of Queensland led by Vince Gair
 Gair Park, heritage-listed park and memorial in Brisbane, Queensland, Australia; named after Vince Gair

Other people
 Anthony H. Gair (born 1948), American attorney and advocate
 Gair Allie (1931–2016), American baseball player
 Gordon Gair (1916–2009), Canadian lacrosse player
 Harry A. Gair (1894–1975), American lawyer
 James Gair (1927–2016), American linguist in South Asian linguistics
 Joanne Gair (born  1958), New Zealand make-up artist and body painter; daughter of George Gair
 Robert Gair, American inventor of the folding carton

Films
 Gair (film), 1999 Indian film
 Gair Kanooni, 1989 Hindi film

Other
 Blackledge-Gair House, a historic house in Cresskill, New Jersey, United States
 Clan Gayre, also known as Clan Gair, a Scottish clan
 Gair dance, a folk dance from Rajasthan, India
 Gair Glacier, a glacier in Victoria Land, Antarctica
 Gair Loch, a sea inlet on the North West coast of Highland, Scotland
 Gair Mesa, a tableland in Victoria Land, Antarctica
 Gair Rhydd, a student newspaper of Cardiff University
 Givar, a town in Iran
 "Lachin y Gair", a 1807 poem by Byron